The Harvard Invitational Shoryuhai Intercollegiate Kendo Tournament, or   for short, is the oldest intercollegiate kendo tournament in North America. Now in its 25th year, the Shoryuhai is hosted annually by the Harvard Radcliffe Kendo Club each spring. This year's  will be held March 18-19, 2023. Teams come from all over North America and Europe, including teams from Canada and Mexico and Germany. The tournament is held in the Harvard University Malkin Athletic Center (MAC) basketball court.  The fundamental purpose of the Shoryuhai is to promote kendo at the collegiate level.

History

Origins
In April 1997, several Northeast-region college students came together at Harvard for an informal good-will kendo tournament. The tournament was sparsely attended - totaling not more than 15 competitors. The following year, attendance increased three-fold, and included teams from Harvard, Yale, Cornell, McGill University, the University of Connecticut and the University of Waterloo in Canada. In 2009, a team from the University of Münster in Germany joined the competition for the first time, making it the first European team to participate.

The Trophies

In 1998, the two tournament trophies were donated by the former Prime Minister of Japan, Mr. Ryutaro Hashimoto, as tokens of his encouragement. At the time, Hashimoto-sensei saw this tournament and all of North American collegiate kendo as a "rising dragon," or 昇龍 (shōryu), hence the name shoryuhai. The first of the trophies - permanently held at Harvard - bears the engraved names of each year's victorious team. The second, traveling trophy is loaned to each year's winning team to be displayed at their respective university or college until the following year's tournament.

Format
The tournament is divided into team and individual rounds on Saturday and Sunday. Individuals are single elimination, unlimited encho, no hantei. Teams are round robin.

Results

Team Tournament

Individuals Tournament

References

External links
 Official Shoryuhai Website at Harvard

Kendo
College sports in the United States